The Allen Water Station is a district of structures in Allen, Texas representing different items built in the 1870s by the Houston and Texas Central Railroad at the Allen Depot water stop. The site includes six contributing structures: the Water Station site, the 1874 Dam, a section of railroad tracks and bed, a 1910 railroad bridge, and the ruins of the water tank and pumping facility.

See also

National Register of Historic Places listings in Collin County, Texas

References

External links
Allen Convention and Visitors Bureau

Buildings and structures in Allen, Texas
Dams completed in 1874
Dams on the National Register of Historic Places in Texas
Historic districts on the National Register of Historic Places in Texas
National Register of Historic Places in Collin County, Texas